The Sociedade Esportiva Palmeiras Youth System is the youth system of football department of Brazilian sports club Sociedade Esportiva Palmeiras. The youth sector is composed of various squads divided by age groups. The U-20 squad currently plays in the Campeonato Brasileiro Sub-20, the Copa do Brasil Sub-20 and the Copa São Paulo de Futebol Júnior. Palmeiras Academy Squads of all categories have won trophies at national and international level. The academy has produced many young successful players that have played in the youth levels of the Brazilian National team such as Gabriel Jesus.

Under 20s

Under 17s

Academy graduates 
Academy graduates currently in Europe.

Honours

Sub 20

Domestic competitions 
 Campeonato Brasileiro – Under 20 (2): 2018 e 2022
 Campeonato Paulista – Under 20 (10): 1992, 1998, 2002, 2004, 2009, 2017, 2018, 2019, 2020 e 2021
 Super Copa São Paulo de Juniores (1): 1995 
 Copa São Paulo de Futebol Júnior: 2022
 Copa Belo Horizonte de Futebol Juniores (2): 1998, 2002
 Copa Rio Grande do Sul de Futebol (1): 2018
 Copa do Brasil Sub-20 (1): 2019 e 2022

Continental competitions 
 Copa Santiago de Futebol Juvenil (1): 2018

Worldwide competitions 
 Torneio Internacional de Bellinzona- Switzerland (2): 2016, 2017
 Terborg Tournament - Netherlands (2): 2018, 2019
 CEE Cup - Czech Republic (2): 2018, 2019, 2022
 Aesch Tournament - Switzerland (1): 2019

Sub 17

Domestic competitions 
 Copa do Brasil Sub 17 (2): 2017, 2019
 Supercopa do Brasil Sub 17 (1): 2019
 Campeão Paulista (15): 1926, 1927, 1937, 1941, 1944, 1952, 1955, 1960, 1961, 1966, 1972, 1976, 1977, 2011, 2018
 Torneio Início do Campeonato Paulista (1): 1964
 Campeão do Estado Juvenil – FPF (2): 1976, 1977
 Campeonato Brasileiro Juvenil (1): 2005
 Copa Rio de Futebol Juvenil (1): 2011
 São Paulo Cup (1): 2015

Continental competitions 
 Copa Santiago de Futebol Infantil (1): 2018

Worldwide competitions 
 Mundial de Clubes Sub-17 (2): 2018, 2019

 SNAF World Cup - France (1): 2019
 International Cup de Arapongas (1): 2013
 Aspire Tri-Series U-17 – Qatar (1): 2014
 Scopigno Cup – Italy (2): 2017, 2018

Sub 15

Domestic competitions 
 Campeonato Paulista (8): 1957, 1959, 1960, 1965, 1985, 2016, 2017, 2019
 Taça São Paulo de Futebol Infantil (1): 1978
 Copa Brasil (1): 2012
 Copa Brasil de Futebol Infantil (1): 2018
 Copa 2 de Julho Sub-15 (1): 2019

Continental competitions 
 Encontro de Futebol Infantil Pan-Americano (EFIPAN) (4): 1983, 1984, 2017, 2018

Worldwide competitions 
 Torneio Brazil-Japan (4): 1999, 2008, 2010, 2017
 Premier Cup (1): 2017
 We Love Football Sub-15 – Italy (2): 2018, 2019
 Evergrande Cup U15 International Football Championship - China (1): 2019
 Jeju International Youth Football Tournament - South Korea (1): 2019

References

External links 
 Tútulos do Palmeiras

Sociedade Esportiva Palmeiras
Football academies in Brazil